Dear Daddy is a 1976 play written by English playwright Denis Cannan, first staged at the Ambassadors Theatre in London's West End.

Plot summary

Productions
 Opening night cast
 Nigel Patrick as Bernard
 Isabel Dean as Mary
 Jennifer Hilary as Gillian
 Joseph Blatchley as Billy
 David Crosse as Frank
 Patrick Drury as Charles
 Rosalind March as Gwen
 Phyllis Calvert as Delia

Awards and nominations 
Awards
 1976 Laurence Olivier Award for Best New Play

References

Further reading
 

1976 plays
Plays by Denis Cannan
Laurence Olivier Award-winning plays
West End plays